G Sudhakar (born 18 May 1959) is an Indian actor, comedian and film producer. He has appeared more than 600 films in predominantly in Telugu and Tamil language films. He produced several films in Telugu, including Yamudiki Mogudu. He won two Nandi Awards.

Early life and personal life 
Sudhakar was born in Markapuram, Prakasam district. His father was a deputy collector who traveled all across Andhra Pradesh. Sudhakar is youngest of Six Brothers, He studied till intermediate in Andhra-Christian College, Guntur and then joined a Madras film institute and ventured into films.

Film career

Telugu films

In the beginning days in the Telugu film industry he was a lead actor in Srushti Rahasyalu, Pavitra Preama, "Agni poolu",'Oorikicchina Maata, Bhogi Mantalu,  Konte Kodallu and others. He then started doing comedy roles which fit him well. He is famous for his peculiar voice modulation. He became a popular comedian in the 1980s and 90s by his dialogue pronunciation.

Tamil films

After intermediate, Sudhakar went to Madras and joined the Madras Film Institute in 1976. There he met Chiranjeevi and Hari Prasad who were his classmates. Among the three, Sudhakar got the first chance to act as a hero with actress Radhika in a Tamil movie Kizhakke Pogum Rail which was a super hit. He then established himself as an actor in Tamil, enjoyed a 100-day run in three of his very few Tamil movies. He and Radhika were a hit pair, acting together in 11 films.

Awards
Nandi Awards
Best Male Comedian - Peddarikam (1992)
Best Male Comedian - Snehitulu'' (1998)

Filmography

Telugu

Actor

Producer

Tamil

Hindi

Kannada

Malayalam

References

Actor Sudhakar: Petty politics forced me to leave Tamil films Actor Sudhakar: Petty politics forced me to leave Tamil films

External links

 Actor Sudhakar: Petty politics forced me to leave Tamil films
An Interview With Sudhakar

Living people
Telugu male actors
Male actors in Telugu cinema
Indian male film actors
Telugu comedians
People from Prakasam district
20th-century Indian male actors
1959 births
M.G.R. Government Film and Television Training Institute alumni
Male actors in Tamil cinema
Indian male comedians
Male actors in Hindi cinema
Telugu film producers
Film producers from Andhra Pradesh
21st-century Indian male actors